Kirsten Velin (born 14 December 1944) is a Danish diver. She competed in the women's 10 metre platform event at the 1964 Summer Olympics.

References

1944 births
Living people
Danish female divers
Olympic divers of Denmark
Divers at the 1964 Summer Olympics
Divers from Copenhagen